Reche Canyon (historically known as Homhoa Canyon, Homoa Canyon, and Homuba Canyon) is a canyon in the far northwestern foothills of the San Jacinto Mountains, northwest of The Badlands in the Inland Empire region of Southern California.  The county line between San Bernardino County and Riverside County is at the approximate midway point of the canyon; the San Bernardino half to the north is mostly within the boundaries of Colton, with a small area in Loma Linda, while the southern half is unincorporated territory of Riverside County. Reche Canyon Elementary School is located in the northern part of the canyon.

Along with San Timoteo Canyon and Pigeon Pass, the canyon links San Bernardino and its surrounding cities in the San Bernardino Valley to the city of Moreno Valley. The road through the canyon is used as a shortcut and to avoid traffic by commuters looking for an alternative to Interstate 215 and California State Route 60.

References

External links
 The Changing Land of Many Hills: A History of Reche Canyon

Canyons and gorges of California
Landforms of Riverside County, California
Landforms of San Bernardino County, California
History of Riverside County, California
History of San Bernardino County, California
Colton, California
Moreno Valley, California
San Jacinto Mountains
Inland Empire
Loma Linda, California